Holiday From Myself is a 1934 German comedy film directed by Hans Deppe and starring Hermann Speelmans,  Carola Höhn, and Georg H. Schnell.

The film's sets were designed by the art directors Willi Herrmann and Hans Kuhnert. It was partly shot on location in Lower Saxony. Deppe himself directed a remake of the film in 1952.

Plot
A stressed American millionaire is advised by his Doctor to take a rest cure in the German countryside. The tycoon is so impressed that he buys an estate and turns it into a resort where other businessmen can take holidays from their normal lives. In the process he falls in love with the estate's former owner.

Cast

References

External links

1934 comedy films
German comedy films
Films of Nazi Germany
Films directed by Hans Deppe
Films based on German novels
UFA GmbH films
German black-and-white films
1930s German films